The J. Reuben Clark Law School (BYU Law or JRCLS) is the graduate law school of Brigham Young University (BYU) in Provo, Utah. Founded in 1973, the school is named after J. Reuben Clark, a former U.S. Ambassador, Undersecretary of State, and general authority of the institution's sponsoring organization, The Church of Jesus Christ of Latter-day Saints (LDS Church).

BYU Law is fully accredited by the American Bar Association (ABA), and a member of the Association of American Law Schools. BYU Law consistently ranks among the nation's top tier of ABA approved law schools according to U.S. News & World Report, and it is consistently recognized for its low tuition and high placement rate in judicial clerkships with U.S. federal judges.

History
On March 9, 1971, the BYU Board of Trustees announced that a law school would be established at the  Just two-and-one-half years later the opening ceremonies were held on  Classes were initially held several blocks south in an old Catholic school building (St. Francis of Assisi,  affectionately referred to as "St. Reuben's" by the students.

The law school's inaugural dean was American lawyer Rex E. Lee, who later served as U.S. Solicitor General during the administration of President Ronald Reagan. The JRCLS Building was completed and dedicated in 1975, and the law school graduated its first class in 1976.  The law school has since graduated more than 5,000 students.

Campus
The nearly  BYU Law building is located on the east side of the BYU campus and backdropped by Y Mountain. The building's five floors contain eleven classrooms, three seminar rooms, a student commons area, a student lunchroom, spaces for student organizations and activities, a large computer lab, and a computer training room.

The Howard W. Hunter Law Library occupies the north wing of the law building and houses a collection of over 450,000 volumes and volume equivalents in paper and microform. The library provides students with 470 individually assigned study carrels, 17 group study rooms, a reading room for quiet study, and a popular reading and conversation room. The library also has two classrooms where library faculty teach legal research and writing classes, familiarizing students with specific types of legal research and with library holdings. In 2014, the National Jurist ranked the Howard W. Hunter Law Library as the 25th best law library in the country.

The campus is located within the original jurisdiction of the United States District Court for the District of Utah and the appellate jurisdiction of the United States Court of Appeals for the Tenth Circuit (except for patent claims and claims against the U.S. government under the Tucker Act, which are appealed to the Federal Circuit).

Academics

Admissions
Many admitted students have graduate and/or doctoral degrees in a wide range of academic disciplines, and most have spent time abroad. Entering students graduated from over 70 different undergraduate colleges and universities in 11 countries and nearly 40 US states.

In 2009, the incoming class had a median GPA of 3.73 and a median LSAT score of 165. Based on these numbers, BYU Law ranks 12th in the nation for GPA and 25th in the nation for LSAT admissions standards.

Admission to the BYU Law School is open to people of any faith or sexual orientation, subject to the school's Honor Code. Among other things, the Honor Code precludes the admission and retention of students who are former members of the LDS Church, or whose actions are categorized as "homosexual behavior," which includes both sexual relations and "all forms of physical intimacy that give expression to homosexual feelings". To verify Honor Code compliance, students are required to obtain, and maintain during their course of study, an ecclesiastical endorsement from a religious leader or designated BYU chaplain. In 2016, the ABA, which accredits the school, conducted a review to determine whether BYU Law School's admission and retention policy was in accordance with its nondiscrimination policy. The ABA ended the review later in 2016 after BYU modified the Honor Code to make it easier for students to obtain an exemption to the ecclesiastical endorsement requirement.

Degree programs

Juris Doctor (JD) program
Most of the students at BYU Law are enrolled in the Juris Doctor (JD) program.  JD students are required to take 90 semester hours of credit in order to graduate. In the first year of law school all students are required to take one semester each of Civil Procedure, Contracts, Criminal Law, Property, Torts, Introduction to Legal Research and Writing, Introduction to Advocacy, Legislation and Regulation, and Structures of the Constitution.  Additionally, each student must take Professional Responsibility during their second or third year and prepare a substantial paper (at least 30 pgs).  Students must also fulfill a Professional Skills Requirement by completing six hours of externship credit or Professional Skills Courses. In addition to their substantive coursework, many second and third-year students participate in moot court, a scholarly publication, a clinic, or an externship.

Joint Degree programs
For students interested in a more general interdisciplinary course of study, BYU Law offers five joint degree programs (usually completed in four years, as opposed to three for a standard JD):
JD-MBA, with the Marriott School of Business
JD-MPA, with the Romney Institute of Public Service and Ethics within the Marriott School of Business
JD-MAcc, with the School of Accountancy  within the Marriott School of Business
JD-MEd, with the David O. McKay School of Education

Master of Laws (LLM) program
For foreign lawyers seeking a master's degree in Comparative American law, BYU Law offers a two semester Master of Laws (LLM) program.  Applicants must have a law degree or certification from an institution located outside the U.S. to participate in the program.

Academic offerings
The student-to-faculty ratio at BYU Law is about 18 to one. The current faculty includes numerous former U.S. Supreme Court and U.S. Circuit Court judicial law clerks. The school hosts several events each year, including the World Family Policy Center / United Nations Conference (July), the International Law and Religion Symposium (October), and the Orrin G. Hatch Distinguished Trial Lawyer Lecture Series (November).

Students at BYU Law publish four law journals: the BYU Law Review, the BYU Journal of Public Law, the BYU Education and Law Journal, and the BYU International Law & Management Review.

Rankings and honors

The U.S. News & World Report's "Best Law Schools" ranked BYU Law 23rd in the country overall (2023), and 3rd for "Law Degrees With Most Financial Value at Graduation" (2016)

The National Jurist named BYU Law 1st in "Best Value Law Schools" (2022, 2021, 2016), and 20th in "Best Law Schools"(overall) (2013) In 2020, The National Jurist reported data from the U.S. Department of Education reflecting that BYU Law had the lowest median federal student debt ($51,250) of any law school in the country. 

Princeton Review's "Best Law School" ranked BYU Law 2nd for "Most Conservative Students" and 3rd in "Most Competitive Students" (2007)

Leiter’s Law School Rankings placed the law school
 13th in United States Supreme Court clerk placement (2003-2013)
 25th in Admissions Selectivity
 33rd in Student Quality
 49th in Scholarly Impact

Employment
According to BYU's official 2013 ABA-required disclosures, within nine months of graduation 64.6% of the Class of 2013 found full-time, long-term, bar-passage-requirement employment; 11.5% found full-time, long-term, JD-advantage employment; and 5.4% found part-time, long-term, bar-passage-required or JD-advantage employment. Overall, 92% of the Class of 2013 found employment within nine months of graduation, and 83.7% of those who found employment were in full-time, long-term positions.  BYU's Law School Transparency under-employment score is 20.4%, indicating the percentage of the Class of 2013 unemployed, pursuing an additional degree, or working in a non-professional, short-term, or part-time job nine months after graduation.

Costs
The total cost of attendance (indicating the cost of tuition, fees, and living expenses) at BYU for the 2016-17 academic year is $33,464 for LDS students and $46,144 for students who are not LDS. Law School Transparency estimated debt-financed cost of attendance for three years is $118,778.  It further estimated the cost of living at $20,352 and the cost of tuition and fees for LDS students at $12,310 while Non-LDS students would pay $24,620 during the 2016-17 term.

Associated organizations
BYU Law students may participate in a wide variety of organizations while attending law school and after graduation. Co-curricular programs include Law Review, Moot Court, Trial Advocacy, and various other student-edited publications. For extracurricular activities, students may choose from more than 30 student-run and professional associations, including the American Constitution Society, the Federalist Society, the Student Bar Association, and the Minority Law Students Association.

Of particular note is the J. Reuben Clark Law Society, which is an organization of law school students and graduates consisting of 65 professional and 125 student chapters throughout the world.  Although students and graduates of BYU Law are de facto members of the society, there is no requirement to attend the law school or to be a member of the LDS Church. The organization claims the following current or former government officials: 14 U.S. Circuit Court of Appeals Judges, 18 U.S. District Court Judges, 4 U.S. Attorneys, 6 U.S. Senators, 9 U.S. Congressmen, dozens of legal officers in Fortune 500 companies, and over 100 State Supreme Court, Appellate Court, and District Court judges. The Society holds an annual conference for students and practicing attorneys. Prior conferences have featured former U.S. Supreme Court Justice Sandra Day O'Connor and current U.S. Supreme Court Justice Clarence Thomas.

Students of the law school were among the members of the first chapter of the American Inns of Court, organized in 1980.

Notable people

Faculty 
Faculty include Kif Augustine-Adams, Cole Durham, Frederick Gedicks, Cheryl Preston, Brett Scharffs, D. Gordon Smith, Lynn Wardle, and Kevin J Worthen.

Notable former faculty have included Hon. Dee Benson, Larry Echohawk, Michael Goldsmith, James D. Gordon III, Hon. Thomas B. Griffith, Bruce C. Hafen, H. Reese Hansen, RonNell Andersen Jones, Hon. Dale A. Kimball, Hon. Mike Lee, Justice Thomas R. Lee, and Hon. Howard C. Nielson Jr., James Rasband

Alumni

Notable BYU Law alumni include three U.S. Circuit Judges, five U.S. District Judges, one U.S. Senator, three U.S. Congressmen, three university presidents, numerous law professors, and an NFL Hall-of-Famer.

Alumni law clerks of the United States Supreme Court

For the 2003–2013 Terms of the United States Supreme Court, BYU Law was ranked #13 nationally in Brian Leiter's rankings for Supreme Court clerkship placement (per capita).

See also
 List of deans of the J. Reuben Clark Law School
 List of law schools in the United States

References

External links

Brigham Young University photographs of campus buildings, including photographs of the law building, UA 827 at L. Tom Perry Special Collections, Brigham Young University

Brigham Young University
Law schools in Utah
Educational institutions established in 1973
1973 establishments in Utah